Ciobanu is a commune in Constanţa County, Romania.

Ciobanu may also refer to:

 Ciobanu (surname), a surname
 Ciobanu River, a tributary of the Slătioara River
 Sebastian Ciobanu (born 1985), Romanian kickboxer